Watchtower Peak is a long mountain ridge on Vancouver Island, British Columbia, Canada, located  southeast of Woss and  east of Maquilla Peak.

The first ascent of Watchtower Peak was in 1975 by J. Gibson Syd Watts.

See also
 List of mountains of Canada

References

Vancouver Island Ranges
One-thousanders of British Columbia
Rupert Land District